Protecode was a private company based in Ottawa, Ontario, Canada that provided open source license and security management software used for software development license compliance.

It was acquired by Synopsys in November 2015 for undisclosed terms.

Products
Protecode Enterprise System is a suite of tools for managing open source software licensing. Protecode utilizes a proprietary database of indexed public open source projects to compare against a software codebase in order to identify open source components and determine license obligations.  

The Protecode product suite produces a software inventory report, cross-referenced to licensing and copyright attributes, to indicate corresponding licensing obligations. Protecode also offers an audit service which can be used to produce an audit report, containing a software bill of materials and a license obligations report. Software audits are commonly requested prior to business transactions, like mergers and acquisitions or financing.

In 2013, Protecode announced a single seat open source management scanning tool.

Services
Protecode offers code auditing services to detect all open source and third party and associated licensing obligations before a product release or mergers and acquisitions .

Partnerships
Protecode is a member of IBM Partnerworld and System 4 received validation from IBM Rational Software for IBM Rational Team Concert and IBM Rational ClearCase.

Protecode is available on IBM SmartCloud.

Protecode Library Auditor integrates with Perforce.

Protecode is a member of the Linux Foundation and a contributor to their Open Compliance Program. Protecode is also a supporter of the Linux Foundation sponsored SPDX specification.

Protecode is a member of the Eclipse Foundation
and the GENIVI Alliance

Awards
 In May 2010, Protecode was included in the “Cool Vendors in Intellectual Property, 2010” report by Gartner, Inc.
 In 2009, The Branham Group included Protecode on its list of the Top 25 Canadian IT Up and Comers

See also
 List of companies of Canada
 Google Code Search
 Koders
 Krugle
 Open Hub

References

Product lifecycle management
Business software companies
Free software companies
Companies based in Ottawa
Software companies established in 2006
Online companies of Canada
Code search engines
Software testing tools